Havana Township may refer to the following townships in the United States:

 Havana Township, Steele County, Minnesota
 Havana Township, Mason County, Illinois